The Gassosa al caffè coffee is a typical Calabrese soft drink, combining gassosa and coffee.

History 
The first coffee soda was distributed, with the name of "Bibicaffè", by the company "De Sarro & Torchia" of Lamezia Terme in 1941. Nowadays the widespread brand are Brasilena from Girifalco and MokaDrink from Cosenza.

Diffusion
Today the coffee soda is exported all over the world, mainly to the United States.

See also 
Coffea

References 

Coffee drinks
Italian drinks
Coffee in Italy